Kresoja is a surname found in Croatia and Serbia. Notable people with the surname include:

 Dragan Kresoja (1946–1996), Serbian film director
 Dragica Kresoja (born 1986), Macedonian handball player of Serbian origin

Croatian surnames
Serbian surnames